Florence May Chadwick (November 9, 1918 – March 15, 1995) was an American swimmer known for long-distance open water swimming. She was the first woman to swim the English Channel in both directions, setting a time record each time. She was also the first woman to swim the Catalina Channel, the Straits of Gibraltar, the Bosporus (one way), and the Dardanelles (round trip).

Biography 

She was born in San Diego on November 8, 1918. Her parents were Richard Chadwick, a police officer, and Mary Lacko, a homemaker who later operated a San Diego restaurant. Chadwick grew up in the Point Loma neighborhood of San Diego and graduated from Point Loma Junior-Senior High School in 1936. She attended San Diego State College and studied at several law schools and a business college. She was married and divorced twice, and had no children.

Chadwick entered swimming competitions from a young age, scoring her first win at the age of ten, but she realized she preferred ocean events rather than pool swims. At the age of 10, she became the youngest person to swim across the mouth of San Diego Bay. Starting at age eleven she competed in rough water swims, winning an annual 2.5-mile race in the ocean off La Jolla 10 times in 18 years. She swam in Southern California ocean races as an amateur for several decades, but had her heart set on swimming the English Channel. In 1950 she attempted to enter a 1950 Channel-swimming contest sponsored by the Daily Mail but was refused for lack of a significant reputation. She determined to try at her own expense, failing in July after 14 hours in the water but succeeding in August in her best-known contribution to swimming history.

On August 8, 1950, at the age of 32, she crossed the English Channel from France to England in 13 hours and 23 minutes, breaking the then-current women's record held by American swimmer Gertrude Ederle. One year later, Chadwick crossed the English Channel again, from England to France this time, in 16 hours and 22 minutes, thus making her the first woman to swim the English Channel in both directions, and setting a record for the England-France journey. She ultimately swam the Channel four times.

In 1952, Florence attempted to swim the 26 miles between Catalina Island and the California coastline. As she began, she was flanked by small boats that watched for sharks and were prepared to help her if she got hurt or grew tired. After about 15 hours a thick fog set in. Florence began to doubt her ability, and she told her mother, who was in one of the boats, that she did not think she could make it. She swam for another hour before asking to be pulled out, unable to see the coastline due to the fog. As she sat in the boat, she found out she had stopped swimming just one mile away from her destination. Two months later, she tried again. The same thick fog set in, but she succeeded in reaching Catalina. She said that she kept a mental image of the shoreline in her mind while she swam. She later swam the Catalina channel on two additional occasions.

During the summer of 1953, she successfully swam the Channel again (setting a new women's record), as well as the Strait of Gibraltar (setting an all-time record of 5:06), the Bosporus, and the Dardanelles. In 1955 she swam the Channel again, breaking her own record time. In August 1957 she swam the Bristol Channel from Weston-super-Mare to Penarth Head, 11 miles in a record-breaking 6 hours 7 mins.

Not all of her long-distance swim attempts were successful. In 1954, she tried to become the first person to swim across Lake Ontario but gave up after becoming ill a few hours into her swim. Other unsuccessful attempts included the Strait of Juan de Fuca and two tries at the Irish Sea (her last major swim attempt in 1960).

She gave product endorsements and served for many years as the spokesperson for Catalina Swimwear. She taught swimming at a number of venues and worked with Esther Williams to design movie swimming sequences. She also worked as a credit counselor and as a stockbroker. She died of leukemia in San Diego in 1995; her ashes were scattered into the ocean off Point Loma.

Recognition 
In December 1951, Chadwick appeared as herself in Faye Emerson's Wonderful Town musical series on CBS television. The program highlighted Chadwick's hometown of San Diego.

On October 30, 1955, she appeared as a guest on "What's My Line?".

In 1962, Chadwick was inducted by the San Diego Hall of Champions into its Breitbard Hall of Fame.

In 1970 she was inducted into the International Swimming Hall of Fame.

See also
 List of members of the International Swimming Hall of Fame

References

External links 

 
 

1918 births
1995 deaths
American female swimmers
American long-distance swimmers
English Channel swimmers
Point Loma High School alumni
San Diego State University alumni
Swimmers from San Diego
20th-century American women
20th-century American people